The 2011 Malaysia Cup (Malay: Piala Malaysia 2011) was the 85th edition of the Malaysia Cup. The soccer competition began on 6 September 2011 and concluded on 29 October 2011 with the final held at Shah Alam Stadium, Shah Alam. A total of 16 teams took part in the competition. The teams were divided into 4 groups of 4 teams, with the group leaders and runners-up after 6 matches qualifying through to the quarterfinals.

Format 
In this competition, the top 12 teams from Malaysian Super League joined the four teams from Malaysian Premier League. The teams were drawn into four groups of four teams, at the Stadium Bukit Jalil on 5 August 2011. 

Due to the withdrawal of Harimau Muda A, the second bottom team in the 2011 Malaysian Super League and the 5th placed team in the 2011 Malaysia Premier League will compete with each other to take Harimau Muda A spot in the 2011 Malaysia Cup.

Pahang FA and Sime Darby FC will play a two legged match to take a place in the 2011 Malaysia Cup replacing Harimau Muda A   

The matches will take place from 6 September 2011 to 29 October 2011. The top two teams in each group will progress to the quarterfinals.

Play Off
In the 2011 Malaysia Cup Play off, Pahang FA and Sime Darby FC will play a two legged match to take a place in the 2011 Malaysia Cup replacing Harimau Muda A.  

Sime Darby FC won 6–0 on aggregate and advanced to the group stage.

Seeding 
The 16 teams were divided into four pots for the draw, each containing four teams. The standings in Super League and Premier League 2011 ended on 9 June 2011 – was used to seed the teams.

{| class=wikitable
!width=25%|Pot 1
!width=25%|Pot 2
!width=25%|Pot 3
!width=25%|Pot 4
|- valign=top
|
 Kelantan FA 
 Terengganu FA 
 Selangor FA 
 Kedah FA|
 Perak FA 
 Johor FC 
 Negeri Sembilan FA 
 T-Team FC|
 Sabah FA 
 Felda United FC 
 Kuala Lumpur FA 
 PKNS FC|
 Sarawak FA 
 PDRM FA 
 Johor FA 
 Sime Darby FC|}

Group stage

Group A

Group B

Group C

Group D

Knockout stage

Bracket

Quarterfinals

First leg

Second legSelangor FA won 4–1 on aggregate and advanced to the semi-finals against Terengganu FA.Negeri Sembilan FA won 3–1 on aggregate after extra time and advanced to the semi-finals against PBDKT T-Team FC.Terengganu FA won 5–3 on aggregate and advanced to the semi-finals against Selangor FA.PBDKT T-Team FC won 4–2 on aggregate and advanced to the semi-finals against Negeri Sembilan FA.Semi-finals

First leg

Second legTerengganu FA won 4–1 on aggregate and advanced to the finals against Negeri Sembilan FA.Negeri Sembilan FA''' won 6–3 on aggregate and advanced to the finals against Terengganu FA.

Final
The final was played at the Shah Alam Stadium, Selangor, on Saturday, 29 October 2011. The original venue was the National Stadium, Bukit Jalil, but the Football Association of Malaysia were forced to change the venue because the national stadium were undergoing repairs on the stadium's roof.

Winners

Statistics

Top Scorer

References

External links
 Piala Malaysia 2011 at Malaysia Football Dimos
 Malaysia Cup at Soccerway 

2011
2011 domestic association football cups
Cup